The 1962–63 season was the 48th in the history of the Isthmian League, an English football competition.

Wimbledon were champions for the second season in a row, winning their seventh Isthmian League title.

League table

References

Isthmian League seasons
I